Renegade Game Studios is an American game company based in Escondido, California that creates and publishes board games, card games and role-playing games. In 2020, they also began producing jigsaw puzzles using art from their games.

History
In 2014, Scott Gaeta, a former Colorado games store owner and co-founder of Cryptozoic Entertainment, founded Renegade Game Studios.

From 2014 to 2017, RGS used traditional industry methods to finance publication of their games. Starting in 2018, RGS used Kickstarter community funding to finance some larger licensed game projects such as Power Rangers: Heroes of the Grid, Scott Pilgrim Miniatures the World, and most recently Vampire: The Masquerade Rivals Expandable Card Game.

Games published 
Game published by RGS between 2014–2021.

 Altiplano
 Apotheca
 Atlas: Enchanted Lands 
 The Aquicorn Cove Board Game
 Arboretum
 Architects of the West Kingdom
 Artsee
 Bargain Quest
 Blood of an Englishman
 Brick Party
 Bubble Tea
 Bullfrogs
 Byzanz
 Castell
 Castles of Caladale
 Circadians First Light
 Circus Puppy
 Clank! A Deck-Building Adventure
 Clank! In! Space! A Deck-Building Adventure
 Clank! Legacy: Acquisitions Incorporated
 ClipCut Parks
 Covert
 Dicey Goblins
 Doggy Go!
 Dokmus
 The Doom That Came to Atlantic City
 Double Feature
 Dragon's HOard
 Eternal: Chronicles of the Throne
 Ex Libris
 Explorers of the North Sea
 Fireworks
 FLATLINE
 Flip Ships
 Flip The Bird
 The Fox in the Forest
 The Fox in the Forest Duet
 FUSE
 Gates of Delirium
 Ghostbusters: The Card Game
 Gloomy Graves
 Gravwell: Escape from the 9th Dimension
 Gunkimono
 Hex Roller
 Hokkaido
 Honshu
 Icarus
 Junk Orbit
 Kepler-3042
 Kids on Bikes
 Kitty Paw
 Knee Jerk
 Lanterns: The Harvest Festival
 Lanterns Dice: Lights in the Sky
 Lotus
 Lucidity Six-Sided Nightmares
 The North Sea Runesaga
 The North Sea Epilogues RPG
 Outbreak: Undead
 Overlight RPG
 Paladins of the West Kingdom
 Prowler's Passage
 Passing Through Petra
 Pie Town
 Power Rangers: Deck-Building Game
 Power Rangers: Heroes of the Grid
 Proving Grounds
 The North Sea Runesaga
 Raiders of the North Sea
 Revolution of 1828
 Reykholt
 Scott Pilgrim's Precious Little Card Game
 Shipwrights of the North Sea
 Sentient
 Slap It
 Space Battle Lunchtime Card Game 
 Spell Smashers
 Spy Club
 Stellar
 Succulent
 Sundae Split
 The Tea Dragon Society Card Game
 Teens in Space
 Terror Below
 Time Chase
 Topiary
 Trajan
 Transformers: Deck-Building Game
 Wardlings Campaign Guide
 Wendake
 World's Fair 1893

Notable Awards
A number of RGS games have been nominated for or have won awards. The most prominent include:

ENnie Awards
 Kids on Bikes was awarded the Gold Medal as the "2019 Best Family Game"

SXSW Game Awards
 Lanterns: The Harvest Festival was a finalist for "2016 Tabletop Game of the Year".
 Clank! In! Space! A Deck-Building Adventure was a finalist for "Tabletop Game of the Year"
 Paladins of the West Kingdom was the winner of "2020 Tabletop Game of the Year"

Spiel des Jahres
 Raiders of the North Sea was nominated for the Kennerspiel des Jahres 2017
 Fox In The Forest was listed as recommended by the Spiel De Jahres 2020 Jury

Mensa International
 Both Architects of the West Kingdom and Gunkimono were named as "2019 Mensa Select Winners"

References 

Board game designers
Board game publishing companies
Role-playing game publishing companies
Trading card companies